California is a small suburban area of Birmingham, England. It lies within Bartley Ward and the Birmingham Edgbaston constituency and is located on the edge of Woodgate Valley Country Park.

History
Originally located in the parish of Northfield and part of Worcestershire the settlement of California takes its name from the California Inn built by Isaac Flavell on the junction of Barnes Hill and Alwold Road. Flavell bought Stonehouse Farm and the surrounding land in 1842, and set up a brick building business. There are tales that the name of the California Inn was taken from the state of California where Flavell had earlier made "something of a fortune" in the California Gold Rush; however, the Gold Rush did not start until 1848, and records show that Flavell was established in business well before that, with operations at Gas Street, as well as the Stonehouse site. The village became well known for its brick making which was helped by the presence of the Dudley No. 2 Canal which ran through the area, the eastern portal of the Lapal Tunnel was also located in California. The area became part of Birmingham in 1911 along with Northfield.

Modern suburb
Today, California is a largely residential area centred on the junction of Barnes Hill (the B4121) and Stonehouse Way. It is bounded to the west by Woodgate Valley Country Park and to its east by the Bournbrook which forms the boundary with Harborne, this also originally formed the boundary between Staffordshire and Worcestershire. The area is home to Hillcrest School and Woodgate Fire Station. Nearby places include Harborne, Bartley Green and Weoley Castle.

Transport
California lies along the B4121 which runs from Cotteridge to Quinton. The area is linked to Birmingham city centre by National Express West Midlands routes 23, 27 and X22. The 27 also links the area to Weoley Castle and Northfield while the 23 and X22 provide links to Bartley Green. Igo bus services 39 and 39A links the area to Quinton and Woodgate Valley.

References

Notes

Bibliography

External links
 California on William Dargue’s A History of Birmingham Places & Placenames . . . from A to Y

Areas of Birmingham, West Midlands